Peter Luczak was the defending champion, but he lost in the second round against Julian Reister.
Robin Haase won in the final 6–4, 6–2 against Tobias Kamke.

Seeds

Draw

Finals

Top half

Bottom half

References
 Main Draw
 Qualifying Draw

Franken Challenge - Singles
2010 Singles